Khanate was an American drone doom supergroup that brought together James Plotkin and Alan Dubin, two members of the defunct band OLD, as well as Tim Wyskida of Blind Idiot God and Manbyrd and Stephen O'Malley of Burning Witch and Sunn O))).

Keeping some similarity to O'Malley's previous band Burning Witch, Khanate produced songs that usually exceeded the 10-minute mark, characterised by extremely slow  tempos, harsh layers of feedback and vocalist Alan Dubin's torturous shrieking.

As of September 24, 2006, Khanate split up, with Plotkin stating that the "lack of commitment from certain members" led to the split.

In the January/February 2009 issue of Rock-A-Rolla magazine, vocalist Alan Dubin stated: "We had a few festival offers which sparked some talk of a reunion but they didn't pan out in the end." He went on to say, "I highly doubt a reunion will happen."

Members 
 Alan Dubin (Vocals)
 Stephen O'Malley (Guitars)
 James Plotkin (Bass)
 Tim Wyskida (Drums)

Discography

Studio albums 
 Khanate (2001)
 Things Viral (2003)
 Capture & Release (2005)
 Clean Hands Go Foul (2009)

Other releases 
 Live WFMU 91.1 (2002, Live)
 No Joy (Remix) (2003, EP)
 Let Loose The Lambs (2004, Live DVD; limited to 230 copies)
 KHNT vs. Stockholm (2004, Live)
 Live Aktion Sampler 2004 (2004, Live)
 Dead/Live Aktions (2005, DVD)
 It's Cold When Birds Fall From The Sky (2005, Live; limited to 500 copies)

See also 
Sunn O)))
Gnaw
Burning Witch
Blind Idiot God
Khlyst

References

External links 
 Southern Lord Label Info
 Load Records Label Info
 Khanate at James Plotkin's website
 
 Khanate at Encyclopaedia Metallum
 
 Khanate at Last.fm

American doom metal musical groups
Heavy metal musical groups from New York (state)
American avant-garde metal musical groups
Musical groups established in 2001
Musical groups disestablished in 2006
Southern Lord Records artists
Musical quartets
Drone metal musical groups
Load Records artists